Urs Kohler (born 2 January 1945) is a Swiss sailor. He competed in the Tempest event at the 1972 Summer Olympics.

References

External links
 

1945 births
Living people
Swiss male sailors (sport)
Olympic sailors of Switzerland
Sailors at the 1972 Summer Olympics – Tempest
Place of birth missing (living people)
20th-century Swiss people